Desmond Llowarch Edward Flower, 10th Viscount Ashbrook  (9 July 1905 – 5 December 1995) was an Irish peer and soldier.

Flower was the only son of Llowarch Flower, 9th Viscount Ashbrook and his wife Gladys Lucille Beatrice, daughter of George Higginson. He was educated at Eton College and went then to Balliol College, Oxford, where he graduated Bachelor of Arts in 1927. Ashbrook worked as a chartered accountant, succeeding to his father's titles on 30 August 1936. Before the Second World War, he joined 79th (Hertfordshire Yeomanry) Heavy Anti-Aircraft Regiment, Royal Artillery, of the Territorial Army, ending the war as a major. After the end of the war in 1945, he was appointed a Member of the Order of the British Empire.

In 1949 Flower was nominated a Deputy Lieutenant for the county of Cheshire and in 1961 vice lord-lieutenant. From 1946, he represented the county also as a Justice of the Peace, retiring from these posts in 1968. Flower joined the council of the Duchy of Lancaster in 1957. He was invested as a Knight Commander of the Royal Victorian Order in 1977 on his retirement from the Council of the Duchy of Lancaster and was director of the Country's Gentlemen Association.

Family
On 8 November 1934, he married Elizabeth (1911-2002), daughter of Captain John Egerton-Warburton; they had three children, two sons and a daughter. Flower died in 1995 and was succeeded in the viscountcy by his older son Michael.

In 2022, a new rose variety, the 'Elizabeth Ashbrook', was named in the late Lady Ashbrook's honour.

References

1905 births
1995 deaths
People from County Laois
Irish expatriates in England
English people of Irish descent
Alumni of Balliol College, Oxford
British Army personnel of World War II
Deputy Lieutenants of Cheshire
Knights Commander of the Royal Victorian Order
Members of the Order of the British Empire
People educated at Eton College
Royal Artillery officers
Viscounts in the Peerage of Ireland
English justices of the peace